The following tables show state-by-state results in the Australian Senate at the 2010 federal election. Senators total 34 Coalition, 31 Labor, nine Green, one Democratic Labor Party, and one independent, Nick Xenophon. New Senators took their places from 1 July 2011.


Quota 

Senate Quota in each State are as follows

Senate Quota in each Territory are as follows

Australia

New South Wales

Primary votes saw the Coalition and the Labor Party win two seats each before preferences were counted, with the Greens ahead of the Coalition for the fifth seat. Preferences from the Family First Party, the Christian Democrats and the Shooters and Fishers saw the Coalition reach the quota first, leading to Fiona Nash winning the fifth seat, while Coalition and Sex Party preferences saw the Liberal Democrats threatening the Greens for the sixth and final seat, but Labor preferences saw the Greens reach the quota. The end result was three seats Coalition, two seats Labor, and one seat Green.

Victoria

The primary vote saw the Coalition win two seats, Labor win two seats and the Greens win one seat, leaving Labor leading for the final seat with a comfortable majority ahead of the Coalition, Family First, DLP and Australian Sex Party. It ended up being a tight race for the final senate seat in Victoria, with preferences from One Nation and the Christian Democrats saw the DLP move ahead of Family First into third place, but Australian Democrat and Liberal Democrat preferences saw the DLP getting overtaken by the Sex Party. However, the Sex Party was overtaken once again by the DLP's Family First preferences, and Sex Party preferences saw the DLP move into second place ahead of the Coalition, whose preferences allowed the DLP to overtake Labor to secure the sixth seat. The final results were two seats Coalition, two seats Labor, one seat Green and one seat Democratic Labor.

Queensland

Primary votes saw the LNP and Labor both winning two seats, with the LNP and Greens having a sizable majority against Family First and the Sex Party for the final two seats. Labor and Australian Democrat preferences saw the Greens reaching the quota, while preferences from the Shooters and Fishers, One Nation, Liberal Democrats, Family First and Sex Party all saw the Australian Fishing and Lifestyle Party make a large gain on the Liberal National Party. However, the gain was not enough and the LNP ended up winning the final seat. The final result was three seats LNP, two seats Labor and one seat Green.

Western Australia

The primary vote saw the Liberals winning three seats and Labor winning two, leaving the Greens with a very comfortable majority against the Nationals and the Sex Party. Socialist Alliance and Labor preferences saw the Greens easily reach the quota.

South Australia

Primary votes saw both the Liberals and Labor winning two seats each, leaving the Greens leading while Labor was narrowly ahead of the Liberals. Sex Party preferences saw the Greens reach the quota to secure the fifth seat, while Family First preferences saw the Liberals overtake Labor to secure the sixth vacancy. The final result was three seats Liberal, two seats Labor and one seat Green.

Tasmania

Primary votes saw the Liberals and Labor both win two seats and the Greens win one, which left Labor ahead of the Greens and the Liberals. It is possible that Liberal preferences may have pushed the Greens ahead of Labor, which would've led to them taking the final seat, but Shooters and Fishers preferences meant that the Liberals ended up ahead of the Greens, and Labor ended up taking the seat with Green preferences. The final result was three seats Labor, two seats Liberal and one seat Green.

Territories

Australian Capital Territory

Labor Senator Kate Lundy was re-elected with well over a quota. Liberal Senator Gary Humphries was also re-elected, with just over (1.01x) a quota. Although the Greens received significantly more votes than in 2007, the two ACT Senators were elected on quotas, leaving no room for preference flows.

Northern Territory

Country Liberals Senator Nigel Scullion, who is also deputy leader of the National Party of Australia, was re-elected with well over a quota of votes. Labor Senator Trish Crossin was also re-elected, with just over (1.04x) a quota of votes. Although the Greens received the next highest number of votes, the two NT Senators were elected on quotas, leaving no room for preference flows.

See also
 Results of the 2010 Australian federal election (House of Representatives)
 Post-election pendulum for the 2010 Australian federal election
 Members of the Australian Senate, 2011–2014

Notes

References

2010 elections in Australia
Senate 2010
Australian Senate elections